This is a list of episodes for The Daily Show with Trevor Noah in 2021.

Due to the COVID-19 pandemic, Noah continued filming episodes from his home, titled The Daily Social Distancing Show with Trevor Noah. The last edition of The Daily Social Distancing Show with Trevor Noah aired on June 18. Following that, the series will go on a summer hiatus with the show returning to the studio on September 13.

2021

January

February

March

April

May

June

September

October

November

December

References

 
Daily Show guests
Daily Show guests
Daily Show guests